The Man Who Turned Into A Stick (棒になった男 – Bō ni natta otoko) is a one-act play written in 1957 by Kōbō Abe. It is the first of three plays written between 1957 and 1969 meant to symbolize the different stages of life, usually shown together.  The first, representing birth, is The Suitcase. The second, The Cliff of Time, represents life itself, or The Process and the third, The Man who Turned into a Stick, is death. This play has been considered as a main example of the current of magic realism in Japanese literature.

Hideo Kojima has referred to the play as thematic inspiration for the 2019 video game Death Stranding, alongside Abe's 1950 short story The Stick.

References

Japanese plays
Magic realism plays
1957 plays